The 1982 Federation Cup was the 20th edition of the most important competition between national teams in women's tennis.  The tournament was held at the Decathlon Club in Santa Clara, CA, United States, from 19–25 July. The United States won their record seventh consecutive title, defeating West Germany in the final without losing a rubber.

Participating Teams

Draw
All ties were played at the Decathlon Club in Santa Clara, CA, United States, on hard courts.

1st Round losing teams play in consolation rounds

First round

United States vs. Indonesia

Belgium vs. Mexico

Brazil vs. France

Hong Kong vs. Chinese Taipei

Czechoslovakia vs. Canada

Philippines vs. Senegal

Austria vs. Israel

Italy vs. Great Britain

Switzerland vs. New Zealand

Japan vs. China

Portugal vs. West Germany

Soviet Union vs. Spain

Peru vs. Argentina

Denmark vs. Netherlands

South Korea vs. Australia

Second round

United States vs. Mexico

Hong Kong vs. Brazil

Czechoslovakia vs. Philippines

Israel vs. Great Britain

Switzerland vs. Sweden

China vs. West Germany

Soviet Union vs. Peru

Netherlands vs. Australia

Quarterfinals

United States vs. Brazil

Czechoslovakia vs. Great Britain

Switzerland vs. West Germany

Soviet Union vs. Australia

Semifinals

United States vs. Czechoslovakia

West Germany vs. Australia

Final

United States vs. West Germany

Consolation rounds

Draw

First round

Argentina vs. Senegal

Chinese Taipei vs. New Zealand

Canada vs. Denmark

Japan vs. Indonesia

Spain vs. South Korea

Austria vs. France

Portugal vs. Belgium

Quarterfinals

Argentina vs. Chinese Taipei

Canada vs. Japan

Spain vs. France

Belgium vs. Italy

Semifinals

Argentina vs. Canada

France vs. Italy

Final

Canada vs. France

References

Billie Jean King Cups by year
Federation
Tennis tournaments in the United States
Sports in the San Francisco Bay Area
1982 in women's tennis
1982 in American tennis